Pavin is a surname. Notable people with the surname include:

Corey Pavin (born 1959), American golfer
Lucia Pavin (born 1947), Italian chef
Mario Pavin (born 1958), Italian rugby union player and coach
Michela Pavin (born 1994), Italian cyclist

See also
Lavin (surname)